Contradictions Collapse is the debut studio album by Swedish extreme metal band Meshuggah. The album was released in 1991 by Nuclear Blast. Contradictions Collapse was originally titled (All This Because of) Greed. The album leans more towards a thrash metal and alternative metal sound than the band's later works, featuring heavy riffs and influences of hip hop and industrial dance in the drum patterns. It was re-released as a digipak with an incomplete version of Meshuggah's second EP, None, in 1998, with no liner notes or lyrics included in the booklet.

Critical reception

Allmusic critic Steve Huey wrote: "Although it's not quite as accomplished as their later work, it's certainly a worthwhile listen, especially for devoted fans."

Track listing

The first 4 tracks from the None EP were included as bonus tracks on the 1998 reissue.

Personnel

Meshuggah
 Jens Kidman − rhythm guitar, backing vocals, lead vocals (tracks 1, 4, 6, and 9)
 Fredrik Thordendal − lead guitar, backing vocals, lead vocals (tracks 2, 3, 5, and 7)
 Peter Nordin − bass guitar
 Tomas Haake − drums, backing vocals, spoken vocals (track 8)

References

External links
 

1991 debut albums
Meshuggah albums
Nuclear Blast albums